Alice Nina Hoysradt, née Conarain (born in Dublin, Ireland) was an Irish writer of over 70 romance novels as her maiden name Nina Conarain and under the pseudonym of Elizabeth Hoy from 1933 to 1980.

Biography
Alice Nina Conarain was born in Dublin, Ireland. She married Mr. Hoysradt. She worked as a nurse, secretary-receptionist, and staff member of the Daily News in London, England, United Kingdom.

She started publishing romance novels in the 1930s at Mills & Boon under the pseudonym of Elizabeth Hoy, she also wrote as Nina Conarain at Arcadia House.

Bibliography

As Elizabeth Hoy
 Love in Apron Strings	(1933)
 Roses in the Snow	(1936)
 Sally in the Sunshine	(1937)	aka 	Nurse Tennant
 Crown For a Lady	(1937)
 Shadow of the Hills	(1938)
 Stars over Egypt	(1938)
 You Belong to Me	(1938)
 You Took My Heart	(1939)	aka 	Doctor Garth
 June for Enchantment	(1939)
 Mirage for Love	(1939)
 Runaway Bride	(1939)
 Enchanted Wilderness	(1940)
 Heart, Take Care!	(1940)
 It Had to be You	(1940)
 You Can't Lose Yesterday	(1940)
 I'll Find You Again	(1941)
 Take Love Easy	(1941)
 Come Back My Dream	(1942)	aka 	Nurse in Training
 Hearts at Random	(1942)
 Proud Citadel	(1942)
 Ask Only Love	(1943)
 One Step from Heaven	(1943)
 You Can't Live Alone	(1943)
 Give Me New Wings	(1944)
 Sylvia Sorelle	(1944)
 Heart's Haven	(1945)
 It's Wise to Forget	(1945)
 Dear Stranger	(1946)
 Sword in the Sun	(1946)
 To Win a Paradise	(1947)
 The Dark Loch	(1948)
 Though I Bid Farewell	(1948)
 Background to Hyacinthe	(1949)
 Immortal Morning	(1949)
 Silver Maiden	(1951)
 The Web of Love	(1951)
 When You Have Found Me	(1951)
 White Hunter	(1951)
 The Enchanted	(1952)
 Fanfare for Lovers	(1953)
 If Love Were Wise	(1954)
 So Loved and So Far	(1954)
 Who Loves Believes	(1954)
 Snare the Wild Heart	(1955)
 Young Doctor Kirkdene	(1955)
 Because of Doctor Danville	(1956)
 My Heart Has Wings	(1957)
 Do Something Dangerous	(1958)
 City of Dreams	(1959)
 Dark Horse, Dark Rider	(1960)
 Dear Fugitive	(1960)
 The Door Into the Rose Garden	(1961)
 Heart, Have You No Wisdom?	(1962)
 Her Wild Voice Singing	(1963)
 Homeward the Heart	(1964)
 Flowering Desert	(1965)
 The Faithless One	(1966)
 Honeymoon Holiday	(1967)
 My Secret Love	(1967)
 Be More Than Dreams	(1968)
 Music I Heard with You	(1969/07)
 It Happened in Paris	(1970/03)
 Into a Golden Land	(1971/04)
 African Dream	(1971/09)
 Immortal Flower	(1972/03)
 That Island Summer	(1973/01)
 The Girl in the Great Valley	(1973/12)
 Shadows on the Sand	(1974/07)
 The Blue Jacaranda	(1975/04)
 Black Opal	(1975/11)
 When the Dream Fades	(1980)

As Nina Conarain
 Give Me New Wings	(1945)
 Shatter the Rainbow	(1946)
 For Love's Sake Only	(1951)

References and sources

1898 births
1982 deaths
Writers from Dublin (city)
Irish romantic fiction writers
Pseudonymous women writers
20th-century pseudonymous writers
20th-century Irish women writers